The Moroni family (sometimes "Morone") was a moderately powerful noble family in Italy.  Their Baroque Palazzo Moroni in Bergamo is a tourist attraction.

Notable members and descendants
Andrea Moroni
Giovanni Morone
Count Pietro Moroni
Dado Moroni
Gaetano Moroni
Ginetta Moroni
Giovanni Battista Moroni
Mario Moroni
Antonio Stradivari
Testaferrata Moroni Viani
Sergio Moroni
Gregorio Moroni
Mia Moroni
Genna Moroni
Peter Moroni
Plinio Moroni - from Sao Paulo, Brazil
Giorgio Moroni
Barry Moroney

See also
:Template:Antonio Stradivari family

Moroni